This is the discography of British singer-songwriter Tanita Tikaram.

Albums

Studio albums

Compilation albums

Singles

Notes

References

Discographies of British artists
Pop music discographies
Folk music discographies